John Grieve (1887 – 1955) was a Scottish footballer who played for Hibernian, Stoke and Watford.

Career
Grieve was born in Edinburgh and began his career with Irish side Distillery before returning to play for Hibernian in 1905. He spent four years at Hibs making 91 League appearances scoring five goals and then moved south to Watford in 1909. After two seasons at Watford he joined Stoke where he played 25 times scoring once a penalty against Coventry City. He later played for South Shields.

Career Statistics

References

External links
Jock Grieve, www.ihibs.co.uk

Scottish footballers
Stoke City F.C. players
South Shields F.C. (1889) players
Hibernian F.C. players
Watford F.C. players
1887 births
1955 deaths
Scottish Football League players
English Football League players
Footballers from Edinburgh
Association football midfielders